In a 2012 IFLR article ("Q&A: Frontier markets: private equity's next challenge", International Financial Law Review (Dec 2012/Jan 2013)), Zain Latif, the principal of pioneer markets investor TLG Capital, singles out Uganda as a country where international private equity investment prospects look good, out of subsahara African countries.  There are significant issues in legal and business frameworks in the region, he notes.

According to article "East Africa: Triumvirate of power", by Harris, Joanne. The Lawyer (Online) (Jun 23, 2014), Uganda is easier for international law firms to enter than Kenya, for example.  In Kenya, foreign firms cannot open offices, but rather can only associate with local independent law firms (though a Kenya Law Reform Commission in progress might lead to change).  And until recently law firm advertising was banned, and regulation of minimum fee levels has been argued to drive clients to seek legal advice elsewhere.  Uganda "is easier", as exemplified by South AFrican firm ENSafrica (ENS) launching an office in Kampala, separately from its previous local affiliate Synergy Solicitors & Advocates, in 2013.  However, in mid-2014 this was still the only firm to have done that.

One major deal in Uganda, then the largest private investment in east africe, was:

See also
 List of law firms in Uganda
 Law Development Centre
 Uganda Law Society

References

Legal procedure
Judiciaries